Pollex sansdigit is a moth of the family Erebidae first described by Michael Fibiger in 2007. It is known from Mindanao in the Philippines.

The wingspan is about 12 mm. The forewing is relatively broad and dark brown. The hindwing is very small and unicolorous dark brown, without a discal spot. The ventral part of the hindwing is transformed to a long log-like cylindrical tube. The underside is unicolorous dark brown.

References

Micronoctuini
Taxa named by Michael Fibiger
Moths described in 2007